Protognathinus is an extinct genus of stag beetle from the Eocene of Europe, known from the Messel Pit in Germany. This genus is known from the single species P. spielbergi.

Etymology 
The specific name spielbergi refers to American film director Steven Spielberg, whose film Jurassic Park the authors considered to have contributed to the revival of interest in the earth's ancient past.

Description 
At  in total length, Protognathinus is one of the largest known fossil beetles in the superfamily Scarabaeoidea. It is comparable to other large fossil beetles such as Cheirotonus otai and Oryctoantiquus borealis. Like other beetle fossils known from the Messel Pit, Protognathinus fossils retain the color of the exoskeleton.

The details of the classification within the family are not well understood, and it is sometimes placed in Lampriminae and sometimes in Lucaninae. Morphological similarities with early Cretaceous species Litholamprima qizhihaoi, described from the Yixian Formation, have been pointed out.

See also 
 Maaradactylus spielbergi - a species of pterosaur named after Spielberg

References

External links 
 

†
Eocene insects
Fossil taxa described in 2001
Prehistoric beetle genera
Prehistoric insects of Europe